Christina Jewelry–Kuma is a UCI Continental team founded in 2015 and based in Denmark. From 2016 they participate in UCI Continental Circuits races.

Team roster

References

External links
 
 

UCI Continental Teams (Europe)
Cycling teams established in 2015
2015 establishments in Denmark
Cycling teams based in Denmark